The Scholarship Examination (also known as the Grade 5 exam) is a highly competitive Sri Lankan examination conducted by the Department of Examinations of the Ministry of Education. It is optional for students to undertake it during the final year of primary school (Grade 5 (usually ages 9–10)). Based on the results of the exam, students could transfer to prominent national schools. The exams are held in two mediums: Sinhala,  and tamil

History
The examinations were introduced by the late Hon. Dr. C.W.W. Kannangara, who took the initiative in establishing free education when he was the Minister of Education. Under this initiative the government established Madhya Maha Vidyalayas (MMV - Central Colleges) that were scattered around the island. The Scholarship Examination was a means for gifted students from villages to move to better schools with government scholarships.

School cut off marks -  2021 scholarship exam (2022.01.22 )

Boys Schools
1  Royal College, Colombo - 188

2  Dharmaraja College, Kandy - 187

3  Ananda College, Colombo - 186

4  Maliyadeva College - 184

5  Kingswood College - 181

6  Nalanda College - 179

7  Richmond College - 176

8  St. Anne's College - 174

9  Rahula College - 171

10 St. Sylvester's College - 169

11 Mahinda College - 166

12 D. S. Senanayake College - 164

13 Isipathana College - 161

14 Thurstan College - 159

15 Bandaranayake College - 157

16 Vidyartha College - 155

17 St. Aloysius' College - 154

18 Mahanama College - 152

19 Joseph Vaz College - 150

20 Ashoka Vidyalaya - 147

Girls Schools
1 Visakha Vidyalaya - 187

2 Devi Balika Vidyalaya - 185

3 Maliyadeva Girls' College - 183

4 Mahamaya Balika Vidyalaya - 181

5 Sirimavo Bandaranaike Vidyalaya - 180

6 Southlands College - 177

7 Rathnavali Balika Vidyalaya - 167

8 Sujatha Vidyalaya - 175

9 Holy Family Convent - 173

10 Anula Vidyalaya - 171

11 Girls' High School - 168

12 St, Paul's Girls School - 167

13 Sanghamitta Balika Vidyalaya - 165

14 Janadhipathi Balika Vidyalaya, Kurunegala - 163

15 Viharamahadevi Balika Vidyalaya, Kiribathgoda - 161

16 Pushpadana Girls' College - 159

17 Yasodara Devi Balika Maha Vidyalaya - 157

18 Sacred Heart Convent - 155

19 Ferguson High School - 153

20 St. Joseph Balika Vidyalaya, Nugegoda - 150

Controversies
In recent years the exam has become extremely competitive, therefore many claim that it puts unnecessary pressure on students at an early age. It has been considered as a "parent's" exam rather than student's. It is necessary to carry out a study on the long term success of the scholars.

This exam is now being used as a tool for Political leaders in Sri Lanka to neglect the development of rural schools.

References

Educational qualifications in Sri Lanka
School qualifications
School examinations